The Guyana national U-20 football  team (also known as Guyana Under-20s or Guyana U-20s) is the junior national football team representing Guyana. They most recently took part in the CONCACAF Under-20 Championship.

Qualification history

Recent matches and results

Players

Head coach: Wayne Dover

References

Under-20
Caribbean national under-20 association football teams
South American national under-20 association football teams